Christian Älvestam (Born 14 April 1976 in Sweden) is a vocalist, lyricist, guitarist, bassist and drummer for several bands from Sweden.  He is, however, best known as the former vocalist for the Swedish metal band Scar Symmetry. He currently performs with several bands, including Solution .45, Miseration, Cipher System, Svavelvinter, Ill-Wisher, Pre-Human Vaults and has made several guest appearances for other music bands. He is most known in the metal community for possessing both an extreme clean singing range and an ability to make powerful growls.

Discography

Scar Symmetry

 Symmetric in Design (2005)
 Pitch Black Progress (2006)
 Holographic Universe (album) (2008)

Unmoored 

 Cimmerian (1999)
 Kingdoms of Greed (2000)
 Indefinite Soul Extension (2003)

Solution .45 

 For Aeons Past (2010)
 Nightmares in the Waking State I (2015)
 Nightmares in the Waking State II (2016)
 TBA (2023)

Svavelvinter 

 Nidingsverk EP (2014)
 Mörkrets Tid (2018)

Miseration 

 Your Demons, Their Angels (2006)
 The Mirroring Shadow (2009)
 Tragedy Has Spoken (2012)
 Black Miracles and Dark Wonders (2022)

Pre-Human Vaults 

 Allegiance Divine (EP) (2022)

Solo Work

In addition to his current bands, Christian  has also released an EP called Self 2.0, written and produced completely by him. Unlike his traditional work, the album consists entirely of clean vocals. In more detail, Christian explains

"It's not exactly a secret that I have a weak spot for more pop-oriented stuff - especially in the vein of the sound of the '80s," he says. "In fact, I have always been listening to softer music, alongside the heavier stuff, which is probably why my own music so often, unintentionally, tend to end up being a mixture of the two. I simply can't help myself when it comes to merging the aforesaid styles together, it seems. I'd like to call it unavoidable influence, as a direct result of having been indoctrinated with both, from childhood upwards. With that said, fighting against it is not an easy thing, whether you want to or not. At the same time, some would call it a mixed blessing, I guess. Anyhow, I have wanted to do something a bit different from what I usually do for a long time now and that is to make an all-stripped-down and laid-back album, where I use my clean vocals only. You who have followed me since the early days know I've made brief digressions, musically, of that sort before, like the 'Final State' trilogy (UNMOORED) and 'Lethean Tears' (SOLUTION .45), to name a few, so it's not like 'Self 2.0' is me heading out into completely unexplored territory. I've been there before, grubbing in its periphery. Then again, I guess you could see 'Self 2.0' as me going all the way for the first time, if you like!

The album was released on 19 October 2012.

Self 2.0 track listing

Others Bands 

 Atoma
 Cipher System 
 Ill-Whisher
 Torchbearer
 The Few Against Many
 Quest Of Aidance
 Incapacity
 Solar Dawn
 Syconaut

Guest appearances
Angel Blake – Clean vocals on the track "Defenseless" from The Descended.
Bloodbath – Harsh vocals on the track “Iesous” from The Fathomless Mastery.
Deadlock – Clean vocals on the track “Dying Breed” from Manifesto.
Demon Hunter – Harsh and clean vocals on the track “Just Breathe” from The World Is a Thorn.
Disarmonia Mundi – Harsh and clean vocals on the track "Ringside Seat to Human Tragedy" from the 2011 reissue of "Mind Tricks" and Clean vocals on the track "The Loneliness Of The Long Distance Runner" from the 2015 album "Cold Inferno".
Feelingless - Harsh and clean vocals on the track "Hope".
Henrik B – Clean vocals on the track “Now and Forever”.
Lowbringer – Clean vocals, guitar, drums, and programming on the track "Planting a New Sun"
Lyriel – Clean and harsh vocals on the track "Black and White" from Skin and Bones.
Monotheist - Harsh vocals on the track "The Grey King" from "Scourge" (2018).
Night Crowned - Clean and harsh vocals on the track "Rex Tenebrae" from "Hädanfärd" (2021).
Nuclear Blast All-Stars: Out of the Dark – Harsh and clean vocals on the track “The Overshadowing”.
One Man Army and the Undead Quartet - Clean vocals on the track "He's Back (The Man Behind the Mask)" from "Error in Evolution"
Sight of Emptiness – Clean vocals on the tracks "Fearless", "Deception", and "Hostility" from Instincts.
The Project Hate MCMXCIX – Clean vocals on the tracks “You Come to Me Through Hell” and “The Locust Principles” from The Lustrate Process and "Summoning Majestic War" from Bleeding The New Apocalypse (Cum Victriciis In Manibus Armis).
Universum – Harsh and clean vocals on the tracks "Fractured Archetype", "Sum of the Universe", and "2.0" from Mortuus Machina.
Zonaria – Clean vocals on the track “Attending Annihilation” from Infamy and the Breed.

References

External links
Christian Älvestam on Myspace

Swedish heavy metal guitarists
Swedish heavy metal singers
1976 births
Living people
21st-century Swedish singers
21st-century guitarists
Scar Symmetry members
Solution .45 members
Miseration members